The Meridian Transit System was the primary provider of mass transportation in Lauderdale County, Mississippi. It ceased operation in 2012 due to a lack of funding.

Routes
1 Bonita Lakes
2 East
4 Broadmoor
6 College
8 West

References

Bus transportation in Mississippi
Meridian, Mississippi